Dawood Public School (DPS) is a trust owned institution that offers education to over 2500 girls in Karachi, Pakistan. 

DPS is affiliated with Cambridge University and offers a highly developed and holistic educational programme for girls from 2 years to 19 years. DPS is offering preschool, primary education, secondary education and preparation for the international GCE. Initially, the school only catered to students from Nursery till Class V, but it progressed right up to O Levels by 1989. In 2010 the Dawood Public School launched 'A' levels education, too.

DPS organised an event simulating the mode of United Nations which catered children from all the other schools around the country to propose conflict resolution on different world affairs. On 16 June 2013 the school has hosted another event to increase the awareness and education system of Pakistan, the school named the event as DPS Open Day Festival which was held in Karachi

History
The DPS was established in 1983 by Ahmed Dawood. He took the initiative to promote education among women. Initially, it served classes from nursery to Class V, but with time the school expanded its services. In 1989, it started offering O-level preparations and has a constant 100% result. Matriculation was introduced in 1995 but later it was exempted to maintain a constant GCE standard. In 2010, it started its A-level education too and a large number of girls are enrolled every year.

Faculty
Faculty of DPS comprises one principal for O level and A level. It has four section heads for its pre-primary, primary, secondary and A-level system. Teachers for primary section are required to have bachelor's degree and for secondary classes they must have done their masters in respective field.

DPS Events

Open Day Festival 
Open Day Festival was celebrated on 16 June 2013

WWF Nature Carnival 
World Wide Fund for Nature Pakistan arranges an event named nature carnival every year in PAF Museum, Karachi, the school has joined hands with WWF to increase the awareness about the protection of environment and follow the green revolution ambitiously.

DALMUN 

DALMUN is the event which followed the mode of United Nations and simulated the same by the students, an event in which school practised how the UN system works in resolving the issues in the world.

Annual Sports Day 2013 
The annual sports day is celebrated every year by school and it is one of the major event and the much anticipated one in the list of DPS. In 2013 the school celebrated the event featuring the sporting activities from 18 to 22 March which were Annual Sports Day and Pakistan Day Celebrations.  The event was an interesting mix of PE displays, yoga, gymnastics, speeches, skits, tableau and prize distribution. The speeches highlighted the importance of the Pakistan Day with a pledge to be good citizens of a nation that came into existence by the sacrifices of great men. All the four houses, Bilquis Edhi House, Fatima Jinnah House, Anita Gulam Ali House and the Bapsi Sidhwa participated in the event.

Magnifi-Science Exhibition 2016 
It was held this year recently 6 7 and 8 October 2017.

TDF (The Dawood Foundation) has organized a three-day Magnifi-Science Exhibition. Aim of Exhibition is to create a kindle for science & technology in minds of student and to create a bridge between industry and students. Around 20,000 students participated in this event on day 1 along with dignitaries.

Gallery

References

1983 establishments in Pakistan
Educational institutions established in 1983
Girls' schools in Pakistan
Schools in Karachi